is a railway station in the city of Akita, Akita Prefecture,  Japan, operated by JR East.

Lines

Station layout
The station has a single island platform  connected by a level crossing. The station has a Midori no Madoguchi staffed ticket office.

Platforms

History
Araya Station opened on February 22, 1920. With the privatization of JNR on April 1, 1987, the station came under the control of JR East.

Passenger statistics
In fiscal 2018, the station was used by an average of 921 passengers daily (boarding passengers only). The passenger figures for previous years are as shown below.

Surrounding area
 Akita Municipal Junior College of Arts and Crafts
 Akita Prefectural Araya High School
 Akita City West Area Public Hall
Akita Omoriyama Zoo

See also
List of railway stations in Japan

References

External links

 JR East Station information 

Railway stations in Japan opened in 1920
Railway stations in Akita Prefecture
Uetsu Main Line
Buildings and structures in Akita (city)